Michael Edward Hutchinson (born March 2, 1990) is a Canadian professional ice hockey goaltender for the Columbus Blue Jackets of the National Hockey League (NHL). Hutchinson was selected by the Boston Bruins in the third round, 77th overall, of the 2008 NHL Entry Draft.

Playing career

Amateur
Hutchinson grew up playing minor hockey for the Barrie Icemen (now Jr. Colts) of the OMHA's Eastern AAA League. He was a member of the Ontario Blues summer hockey team that featured other notable graduates such as Steven Stamkos, John Tavares, Alex Pietrangelo, Michael Del Zotto, Stefan Della Rovere, Cody Hodgson and Cameron Gaunce. Hutchinson was selected in the third round, 69th overall, of the 2006 OHL Priority Selection by his hometown Barrie Colts. After three years in Barrie, Hutchinson was traded in the summer of 2009 to the London Knights, where he finished his junior career.

Professional

On March 30, 2010, the Boston Bruins signed Hutchinson to a three-year, entry-level contract. Having split the 2010–11 season with the Bruins' minor league affiliates—the Providence Bruins of the American Hockey League (AHL) and the Reading Royals of the ECHL—on April 12, 2011, Hutchinson was recalled by Boston to the NHL. On March 3, 2012, just one day after his 22nd birthday, Hutchinson was recalled by Boston to serve as the team's back-up goaltender on the night due to an injury to starter Tuukka Rask.

On July 19, 2013, as a free agent, Hutchinson signed a one-year, two-way contract with the Winnipeg Jets. He was assigned to the Jets' secondary affiliate, the Ontario Reign of the ECHL to begin the 2013–14 season. Hutchinson posted 22–4–2 record with the Reign, earning a promotion to Winnipeg's AHL affiliate, the St. John's IceCaps. With the IceCaps' starting goaltender Edward Pasquale suffering season-ending injury, Hutchinson posted a 15–5 record before earning a recall to the Winnipeg Jets on March 15, 2014.

On April 7, 2014, Hutchinson made his NHL debut in a 1–0 loss to the Minnesota Wild. He played the final two games of the season with the Jets, claiming his first career NHL win with Winnipeg in a 2–1 shootout win over the Boston Bruins on April 10. He was returned to the IceCaps for the 2014 AHL playoffs, and was instrumental in helping St. John's reach the Calder Cup finals for the first time in franchise history. On July 2, 2014, the Jets signed Hutchinson to a two-year contract extension. Hutchinson played in the 2014–15 season in the NHL as the back-up to Jets starter Ondřej Pavelec. Hutchinson would finish the season with a 21–10–5 record.

On June 21, 2016, Hutchinson signed another two-year contract extension with the Jets.

On July 1, 2018, having left the Jets as a free agent after five seasons, Hutchinson signed a one-year, $1.3 million contract with the Florida Panthers. After attending the Panthers' 2018 training camp, Hutchinson was reassigned to begin the 2018–19 season with their AHL affiliate, the Springfield Thunderbirds. However, he was soon recalled to the Panthers after an injury to starting goaltender Roberto Luongo, and made his debut with Florida in a 5–4 overtime defeat to the Philadelphia Flyers on October 16, 2018. Hutchison collected his first and only win with the Panthers in relief in the following contest against the Washington Capitals on October 19, 2018. After four games with the Panthers, and following the return to health of Luongo, Hutchinson was reassigned to the Thunderbirds.

Hutchinson appeared in eight games with Springfield before being traded on December 29, 2018, to the Toronto Maple Leafs in exchange for a 2020 fifth-round draft pick. He was immediately reassigned to join Toronto's AHL affiliate, the Toronto Marlies. After being recalled to the NHL, on January 3, 2019, he made his debut with the Leafs in a 4–3 loss against the Minnesota Wild. On January 5, in his second game for the Leafs, he recorded his first victory in the Maple Leafs uniform, earning a shutout in a 5–0 win against the Vancouver Canucks.

On June 29, 2019, Hutchinson agreed to a one-year, one-way $700,000 contract extension to remain with the Maple Leafs. Assuming the backup duties for the Maple Leafs entering the 2019–20 season, Hutchinson was unable to solidify his role posting a 0–4–1 record through his first six games before he was re-assigned to AHL affiliate, the Toronto Marlies, on November 12, 2019. He later returned to the Maple Leafs on November 29, 2019, and played sparingly in recording 4 wins through 15 games. On February 13, 2020, Hutchinson was placed on waivers by the Maple Leafs, eight days after the team had traded for backup goaltender Jack Campbell. He cleared waivers the next day and was loaned to the Toronto Marlies.

On February 24, 2020, Hutchinson was traded by the Maple Leafs to the Colorado Avalanche in exchange for Calle Rosén. Remaining with the Avalanche to cover for injured goaltender Philipp Grubauer, he served as the backup to Pavel Francouz. On March 2 (his 30th birthday), Hutchinson recorded his first win with the team, making 17 saves in a 2-1 win over the Detroit Red Wings. With the season soon halted due to the COVID-19 pandemic, Hutchinson later returned to the team as the club's third choice goaltender in the 2020 Stanley Cup playoffs.

Following injuries to both Grubauer and Francouz, Hutchinson made his playoff debut during the second round in relief of Francouz, making three saves during a 5-4 defeat to the Dallas Stars on August 30, 2020. Entering Game 5, with the Avalanche down 3-1 in the series, Hutchinson made his first start to record 31 saves in posting his first-career postseason victory on August 31, 2020. He became just the seventh goaltender in NHL history to win his first two starts while facing elimination in Game 6, helping the Avalanche level the series 3-3 after a 4-1 victory on September 2, 2020. He was unable to help advance the Avalanche to the conference finals, suffering a 5-4 overtime defeat in his fourth career post-season appearance on September 4, 2020.

As a free agent at the conclusion of his contract with the Avalanche, Hutchinson opted to return to the Maple Leafs, securing a two-year, two-way contract on October 30, 2020.

On July 13, 2022, Hutchinson continued his journeyman career in the NHL, agreeing to a one-year, two-way contract with the Vegas Golden Knights. In the following 2022–23 season, Hutchinson was re-assigned to add depth to the Golden Knights AHL affiliate, the Henderson Silver Knights. He collected just 1 win through 7 games with the Silver Knights and was recalled to the Golden Knight on multiple occasions without making his debut with the club. On March 2, 2023, the Golden Knights traded Hutchinson to the Columbus Blue Jackets and a seventh-round pick in 2025, in exchange for Jonathan Quick.

Career statistics

References

External links

1990 births
Living people
Barrie Colts players
Boston Bruins draft picks
Canadian ice hockey goaltenders
Colorado Avalanche players
Columbus Blue Jackets players
Florida Panthers players
Henderson Silver Knights players
Ice hockey people from Simcoe County
London Knights players
Manitoba Moose players
Ontario Reign (ECHL) players
Providence Bruins players
Reading Royals players
St. John's IceCaps players
Sportspeople from Barrie
Springfield Thunderbirds players
Toronto Maple Leafs players
Toronto Marlies players
Winnipeg Jets players